Iridescent Cloud is a sculpture by Laura Haddad and Tom Drugan, installed outside the Denver Museum of Nature & Science, in Denver, Colorado, U.S.

References

Outdoor sculptures in Denver